The Durand Line, forms the Afghanistan–Pakistan border, a  international land border between Afghanistan and Pakistan in South Asia. The western end runs to the border with Iran and the eastern end to the border with China.

The Durand Line was established in 1893 as the international border between India and the Emirate of Afghanistan by Mortimer Durand, a British diplomat of the Indian Civil Service, and Abdur Rahman Khan, the Afghan Emir, to fix the limit of their respective spheres of influence and improve diplomatic relations and trade. The British considered Afghanistan to be an independent state at the time, although they controlled its foreign affairs and diplomatic relations.

The single-page Agreement, dated 12 November 1893, contains seven short articles, including a commitment not to exercise interference beyond the Durand Line. Established towards the close of the British–Russian "Great Game", the resulting line established Afghanistan as a buffer zone between British and Russian interests in the region. The line, as slightly modified by the Anglo-Afghan Treaty of 1919, was inherited by Pakistan in 1947, following its independence.

The Durand Line cuts through the Pashtun tribal areas and further south through the Balochistan region, politically dividing ethnic Pashtuns, as well as the Baloch and other ethnic groups, who live on both sides of the border. It demarcates Khyber Pakhtunkhwa, Balochistan and Gilgit-Baltistan of northern and western Pakistan from the northeastern and southern provinces of Afghanistan. From a geopolitical and geostrategic perspective, it has been described as one of the most dangerous borders in the world.

Although the Durand Line is internationally recognized as the western border of Pakistan, it remains largely unrecognized in Afghanistan. Sardar Mohammed Daoud Khan, former prime minister and president of Afghanistan, vigorously opposed the border and launched a propaganda war – however during his visit to Pakistan in August 1976 he softened his tone by recognising the Durand line as the border. In 2017, amid cross-border tensions, former Afghan President Hamid Karzai said that Afghanistan will "never recognise" the Durand Line as the border between the two countries.

Historical background 

The area through which the Durand Line runs has been inhabited by the indigenous Pashtuns since ancient times, at least since 500 B.C. The Greek historian Herodotus mentioned a people called Pactyans living in and around Arachosia as early as the 1st millennium BC. The Baloch tribes inhabit the southern end of the line, which runs in the Balochistan region that separates the ethnic Baloch people.

Arab Muslims conquered the area in the 7th century and introduced Islam to the Pashtuns. It is believed that some of the early Arabs also settled among the Pashtuns in the Sulaiman Mountains. It is important to note that these Pashtuns were historically known as "Afghans" and are believed to be mentioned by that name in Arabic chronicles as early as the 10th century. The Pashtun area (known today as the "Pashtunistan" region) fell within the Ghaznavid Empire in the 10th century followed by the Ghurids, Timurids, Mughals, Hotakis, by the Durranis, and thereafter the Sikhs.

In 1839, during the First Anglo-Afghan War, British-led Indian forces invaded Afghanistan and initiated a war with the Afghan rulers. Two years later, in 1842, the British were defeated and the war ended. The British again invaded Afghanistan in 1878, during the Second Anglo-Afghan War. The British were successful in installing an Amir – Abdur Rahman Khan and the Treaty of Gandamak was signed in 1880. Afghanistan ceded control of various frontier areas to the British Empire. In addition to having attained all of their geopolitical objectives the British withdrew.

In 1893, Mortimer Durand was dispatched to Kabul by the Government of India to sign an agreement with Amir Abdur Rahman Khan for fixing the limits of their respective spheres of influence as well as improving diplomatic relations and trade. On 12 November 1893, the Durand Line Agreement was reached. The two parties later camped at Parachinar, a small town near Khost in Afghanistan, which is now part of the Federally Administered Tribal Areas (FATA) of Pakistan, to delineate the frontier.

From the British side, the camp was attended by Mortimer Durand and Sahibzada Abdul Qayyum, Political Agent Khyber Agency representing the British Viceroy of India and Governor General of India. The Afghan side was represented by Sahibzada Abdul Latif and a former governor of Khost Province in Afghanistan, Sardar Shireendil Khan, representing Amir Abdur Rahman Khan. The original 1893 Durand Line Agreement was written in English, with translated copies in Dari.

The resulting agreement or treaty led to the creation of a new province called the North-West Frontier Province, now known as Khyber Pakhtunkhwa, a province of Pakistan which includes FATA and the Frontier Regions. It also led to Afghanistan receiving Nuristan and Wakhan.

Demarcation surveys on the Durand Line 
The initial and primary demarcation, a joint Afghan-British survey and mapping effort, covered  and took place from 1894 to 1896. Detailed topographic maps locating hundreds of boundary demarcation pillars were soon published and are available in the Survey of India collection at the British Library.

The complete 20-page text of these detailed joint Afghan-British demarcation surveys is available in several sources.

In 1896, the long stretch from the Kabul River to China, including the Wakhan Corridor, was declared demarcated by virtue of its continuous, distinct watershed ridgeline, leaving only the section near the Khyber Pass to be finally demarcated in the treaty of 22 November 1921, signed by Mahmud Tarzi, "Chief of the Afghan Government for the conclusion of the treaty" and "Henry R. C. Dobbs, Envoy Extraordinary and Chief of the British Mission to Kabul."
A very short adjustment to the demarcation was made at Arundu (Arnawai) in 1933–34.

Cultural impact of the Durand Line

Shortly after demarcation of the Durand Line, the British began connecting the region on its side of the Durand Line to the North Western State Railway. Meanwhile, Abdur Rahman Khan conquered the Nuristanis and made them Muslims. Concurrently, Afridi tribesmen began rising up in arms against the British, creating a zone of instability between Peshawar and the Durand Line. Further, frequent skirmishes and wars between Afghanistan and India starting in the 1870s made travel between Peshawar and Jalalabad almost impossible. As a result, travel across the boundary was almost entirely halted. Further, the British recruited tens of thousands of local Pashtuns into the Indian Army and stationed them throughout India and southeast Asia. Exposure to India, combined with the ease of travel eastwards into Punjab and the difficulty of travel towards Afghanistan, led many Pashtuns to orient themselves towards the heartlands of India and away from Kabul. By the time of Indian independence, political opinion was divided into those who supported a homeland for Muslim Indians in the shape of Pakistan, those who supported reunification with Afghanistan, and those who believed that a united India would be a better option.

British Indian Empire declares war on Afghanistan 

The Durand Line triggered a long-running controversy between the governments of Afghanistan and India, especially after the outbreak of the Third Anglo-Afghan War when Afghanistan's capital (Kabul) and its eastern city of Jalalabad were bombed by the No. 31 and No. 114 Squadrons of the British Royal Air Force in May 1919. Afghan rulers reaffirmed in the 1919, 1921, and 1930 treaties to accept the Indo-Afghan frontier.

Territorial dispute between Afghanistan and Pakistan 

Pakistan inherited the 1893 agreement and the subsequent 1919 Treaty of Rawalpindi after the Partition of India in 1947.  There has never been a formal agreement or ratification between Islamabad and Kabul. Pakistan believes, and international convention under uti possidetis juris supports, the position that it should not require an agreement to set the boundary; courts in several countries around the world and the Vienna Convention have universally upheld via uti possidetis juris that binding bilateral agreements are "passed down" to successor states. Thus, a unilateral declaration by one party has no effect; boundary changes must be made bilaterally.

At the time of independence, the indigenous Pashtun people living on the border with Afghanistan were given only the choice of becoming a part either of India or Pakistan. Further, by the time of the Indian independence movement, prominent Pashtun nationalists such as Abdul Ghaffar Khan and his Khudai Khidmatgar movement advocated a united India, and not a united Afghanistan – highlighting the extent to which infrastructure and instability together began to erode Pashtun self-identification with Afghanistan. By the time of independence, popular opinion amongst Pashtuns was split amongst the majority who wished to join the newly formed state of Pakistan, and the minority who wished to become a part of the Dominion of India. When the idea of a united India failed, Ghaffar Khan pledged allegiance to Pakistan and started campaigning for the autonomy of Pakistan's Pashtuns.

On 26 July 1949, when Afghan–Pakistan relations were rapidly deteriorating, a loya jirga was held in Afghanistan after a military aircraft from the Pakistan Air Force bombed a village on the Afghan side of the Durand Line in response to cross-border fire from the Afghan side. In response, the Afghan government declared that it recognised "neither the imaginary Durand nor any similar line" and that all previous Durand Line agreements were void. They also announced that the Durand ethnic division line had been imposed on them under coercion/duress and was a diktat. This had no tangible effect as there has never been a move in the United Nations to enforce such a declaration due to both nations being constantly busy in wars with their other neighbours (See Indo-Pakistani wars and Civil war in Afghanistan). In 1950 the House of Commons of the United Kingdom held its view on the Afghan-Pakistan dispute over the Durand Line by stating:

At the 1956 SEATO (Southeast Asia Treaty Organization) Ministerial Council Meeting held at Karachi, capital of Pakistan at the time, it was stated:

In 1976, the then president of Afghanistan, Sardar Mohammed Daoud Khan recognised Durand Line as international border between Pakistan and Afghanistan. He made this declaration while he was on an official visit to Islamabad, Pakistan.

Geography

The border is south of the Hindu Kush, while its eastern end by China is in the Karakoram range. These are regions of extreme high elevation, hence much of the Durand Line is bounded by mountains. The Spīn Ghar (White Mountains) range is roughly in the middle of the Line. The western part of the Line meanwhile is lower and sparse, consisting of the Registan Desert.

The highest peak, Noshaq, is located along the border between two countries, while some of the highest peaks in the world, including K2, are a short distance to the east of the Line's end on the Pakistani side.

The Kunar River, Kabul River, Kurram River and Gomal River all cross the Durand Line. At the very western end of the line is the Godzareh depression.

Border regions
Twelve Afghan provinces are located along the border: Nimroz, Helmand, Kandahar, Zabul, Paktika, Khost, Paktia, Logar, Nangarhar, Kunar, Nuristan and Badakhshan – three Pakistani administrative units are located along the border: Balochistan province, Khyber Pakhtunkhwa province and Gilgit-Baltistan region.

Since India claims all of Kashmir, India technically considers to have a 106 km border with Afghanistan (through Pakistani-controlled Gilgit-Baltistan in Kashmir and the Wakhan Corridor on the Afghan side), a view that has been echoed by some Indian politicians including the Home Minister. However the official ministry document itself does not mention a border with Afghanistan. The Pakistani foreign minister has also denied the existence of an Afghan-Indian border.

Border crossings and economy

The two countries are major trade partners, and therefore the various border crossings are economically important for the wider region, particularly the Torkham and Khyber Pass that is also the main land connection between Central Asia and the Indian subcontinent.

Contemporary era 

Pakistan's intelligence agency the Inter-Services Intelligence (ISI) has been heavily involved in the affairs of Afghanistan since the late 1970s. During Operation Cyclone, the ISI, with support and funding from the Central Intelligence Agency (CIA) of the United States, recruited mujahideen militant groups on the Pakistani side of the Durand line to cross into Afghanistan's territory for missions to topple the Soviet-backed Afghan government. Afghanistan KHAD was one of two secret service agencies believed to have been conducting bombings in parts of the North West Frontier (now Khyber Pakhtunkhwa) during the early 1980s. U.S State Department blamed WAD (a KGB-created Afghan secret intelligence agency) for terrorist bombings in Pakistan's cities in 1987 and 1988. It is also believed that Afghanistan's PDPA government supported the leftist Al-Zulfiqar organization of Pakistan, the group accused of the 1981 hijacking of a Pakistan International Airlines plane from Karachi to Kabul.

After the collapse of the pro-Soviet Afghan government in 1992, Pakistan, despite Article 2 of the Durand Line Agreement which states "The Government of India will at no time exercise interference in the territories lying beyond this line on the side of Afghanistan", attempted to create a puppet state in Afghanistan prior to Taliban control according to US Special Envoy on Afghanistan Peter Tomsen. According to a summer 2001 report in The Friday Times, even the Taliban leaders challenged the very existence of the Durand Line when former Afghan Interior Minister Abdur Razzaq and a delegation of about 95 Taliban visited Pakistan. The Taliban refused to endorse the Durand Line despite pressure from Islamabad, arguing that there shall be no borders among Muslims. When the Taliban government was removed in late 2001, the Afghan President Hamid Karzai also began resisting the Durand Line, and today the present Government of Afghanistan does not recognize Durand Line as its international border. No Afghan government has recognized the Durand Line as its border since 1947.

The Afghan Geodesy and Cartography Head Office (AGCHO) depicts the line on their maps as a de facto border, including naming the "Durand Line 2310 km (1893)" as an "International Boundary Line" on their home page. However, a map in an article from the "General Secretary of The Government of Balochistan in Exile" extends the border of Afghanistan to the Indus River. The Pashtun-dominated Government of Afghanistan not only refuses to recognise the Durand Line as the international border between the two countries, it claims that the Pashtun territories of Pakistan rightly belong to Afghanistan. The Durand Line Agreement makes no mention of a time limit, thus suggesting the treaty has no expiry date. In 2004, spokespersons of U.S. State Department's Office of the Geographer and Global Issues and British Foreign and Commonwealth Office also pointed out that the Durand Line Agreement has no mention of an expiry date.

Because the Durand Line divides the Pashtun and Baloch people, it continues to be a source of tension between the governments of Pakistan and Afghanistan. In August 2007, Pakistani politician and the leader of Jamiat Ulema-e-Islam, Fazal-ur-Rehman, urged Afghanistan to recognise the Durand Line. Press statements from 2005 to 2007 by former Pakistani President Musharraf calling for the building of a fence on the Durand Line have been met with resistance from numerous Pashtun political parties in Afghanistan. Pashtun politicians in Afghanistan strenuously object to even the existence of the Durand Line border. In 2006 Afghan President Hamid Karzai warned that "Iran and Pakistan and others are not fooling anyone."

Aimal Faizi, spokesman for the Afghan President, stated in October 2012 that the Durand Line is "an issue of historical importance for Afghanistan. The Afghan people, not the government, can take a final decision on it."

Recent border skirmishes 

In July 2003, Pakistani and Afghan forces clashed over border posts. The Afghan government claimed that the Pakistani military established bases up to 600 meters inside Afghanistan in the Yaqubi area near bordering Mohmand District. The Yaqubi and Yaqubi Kandao (Pass) area were later found to fall within Afghanistan. In 2007, Pakistan erected fences and posts a few hundred metres inside Afghanistan near the border-straddling bazaar of Angoor Ada in South Waziristan, but the Afghan National Army quickly removed them and began shelling Pakistani positions. Leaders in Pakistan said the fencing was a way to prevent Taliban militants from crossing over between the two nations, but Afghan President Hamid Karzai believed that it is Islamabad's plan to permanently separate the Pashtun tribes. Special Forces from the United States Army were based at Shkin, Afghanistan, seven kilometres west of Angoor Ada, from 2002. In 2009, the International Security Assistance Force (ISAF) and American CIA began using unmanned aerial vehicles from the Afghan side to hit terrorist targets on the Pakistani side of the Durand Line.

The border area between Afghanistan and Pakistan has long been one of the most dangerous places in the world, due largely to very little government control. It is legal and common in the region to carry guns, and assault rifles and explosives are common. Many forms of illegal activities take place, such as smuggling of weapons, narcotics, lumber, copper, gemstones, marble, vehicles, and electronic products, as well as ordinary consumer goods. Kidnappings and murders are frequent.
Militants frequently cross the border from both sides to conduct attacks.  Recently, 300 Taliban militants from Afghanistan's territory launched attacks on Pakistani border posts in which 34 Pakistani security forces were believed to be killed. In June 2011 more than 500 Taliban militants entered Upper Dir area from Afghanistan and killed more than 30 Pakistani security forces. Police said the attackers targeted a checkpost, destroyed two schools and several houses, while killing a number of civilians.

The governments of Pakistan and Afghanistan are both trying to extend the rule of law into the border areas. At the same time, the United States is reviewing the Reconstruction Opportunity Zones (ROZ) Act in Washington, D.C., which is supposed to help the economic status of the Pashtun and Baloch tribes by providing jobs to a large number of the population on both sides of the Durand Line border.

Much of the northern and central Durand line is quite mountainous, where crossing the border is often only practical in the numerous passes through the mountains. Border crossing is very common, especially among Pashtuns who cross to meet relatives or to work.  The movement of people across the border has largely been unchecked or uncontrolled, although passports and visas are at times checked at official crossings. In June 2011 the United States installed a biometric system at the border crossing near Spin Boldak, aimed at improving the security situation and blocking the infiltration of insurgents into southern Afghanistan.

Throughout June and into July 2011, Pakistan Chitral Scouts and local defence militias suffered deadly cross-border raids. In response the Pakistani military shelled some Afghan villages in Afghanistan's Nuristan, Kunar, Nangarhar, and Khost provinces resulting in a number of Afghan civilians being killed. Afghanistan's Interior Ministry claimed that nearly 800 rockets were fired from Pakistan, hitting civilian targets inside Afghanistan. The Afghan statement claimed that attacks by Pakistan resulted in the deaths of 42 Afghan civilians, including 30 men and 12 women and girls, wounded 55 others and destroyed 120 homes. Although Pakistan claimed it was an accident and just routine anti-Taliban operations, some analysts believe that it could have been a show of strength by Islamabad. For example, a senior official at the Council on Foreign Relations explained that because the shelling was of such a large scale, it was more likely a warning from Pakistan than an accident.

The United States and other NATO states often ignored this sensitive issue, likely because of potential effects on their war strategy in Afghanistan. Their involvement could have strained relations and jeopardized their own national interests in the area. This came after the November 2011 NATO bombing in which 24 Pakistani soldiers were killed. In response to that incident, Pakistan decided to cut off all NATO supply lines as well as boost border security by installing anti-aircraft guns and radars to monitor air activity. Regarding the Durand Line, some rival maps are said to display discrepancies of as much as five kilometres.

Trench being built alongside the border
In June 2016, Pakistan announced that it had completed 1,100 km of trenches along the Pakistan-Afghanistan border (Durand Line) in Balochistan to check movement of terrorists and smugglers across border into Pakistan from Afghanistan. Plans to expand this trench/ berm/ fence work were announced in March 2017. The plans also included building 338 checkpoints and forts along the border by 2019.

2017 border closure and reopening
On 16 February, Pakistan closed the border crossings at Torkham and Chaman due to security reasons following the Sehwan blast. On 7 March, the border was reopened for two days to facilitate the return of people to their respective countries who had earlier crossed the border on valid visas. The decision was taken after repeated requests by Afghanistan's government to avert 'a humanitarian crisis'. According to a Pakistani official, 24,000 Afghans returned to Afghanistan, while 700 Pakistanis returned to Pakistan, before the border was indefinitely closed again. On 20 March, Pakistani Prime Minister Nawaz Sharif ordered the reopening of Afghanistan–Pakistan border as a "goodwill gesture", 32 days after it was closed.

On 5 May, following an attack on Pakistani census team by Afghan forces and the resulting exchange of fire between the two sides, the border was closed again.

Pakistan's decision to close the border was to force Afghanistan to take action against militant groups who were using Afghanistan's soil to carry out cross-border attacks against Pakistan. An Afghan diplomat at the World Trade Organization (WTO) claimed that Afghanistan suffered a loss of 90 million U.S. dollars as a result of closure of border by Pakistan. On 27 May 2017, Pakistan reopened the border after a request from Afghan authorities, marking the end of the border closure that lasted 22 days.

Border barrier

Pakistan is constructing a border barrier since 2017 to prevent terrorism, drug trafficking, refugees, illegal immigration, smuggling and infiltration across the international border. According to Pakistan the barrier is also necessary to block the infiltration of militants across the border. As of January 2019, 900 km has been completed. The Durand Line is marked by 235 crossing points, many of which had been susceptible to illegal immigration. The project is predicted to cost at least $532 million.

As of 21 January 2022 the interior minister of Pakistan stated that only 20 km of fencing remains and it will be completed soon .

See also 

 Af-Pak
 Afghanistan–Pakistan border skirmishes
 Afghanistan–Pakistan Confederation plan
 Afghanistan–Pakistan relations
 Khyber Pass Economic Corridor
 Noshaq

References

Further reading 
  Dogra, R. (2019) Durand's Curse: A Line Across the Pathan Heart, Rupa: New Delhi.

External links

 Text of the Durand Line Agreement, 12 November 1893 
 1934 Afghanistan & Britain exchange of treaty notes, borders in the neighbourhood of Arnawai and Dokalim
 The Durand Line Agreement (1893): Its Pros and Cons
 "The Durand Line: History and Problems of the Afghan-Pakistan Border" Bijan Omrani, published in Asian Affairs, vol. 40, Issue 2, 2009.
 "Rethinking the Durand Line: The Legality of the Afghan-Pakistan Border", published in the RUSI Journal, Oct 2009, Vol. 154, No. 5
 No Man's Land – Where the imperialists' Great Game once unfolded, tribal allegiances have made for a "soft border" between Afghanistan and Pakistan—and a safe haven for smugglers, militants and terrorists
 Culture, Politics Hinder U.S. Effort to Bolster Pakistani Border, The Washington Post 30 March 2008
 "Border Complicates War in Afghanistan", The Washington Post, 4 April 2008

 
 
border
1893 establishments in Afghanistan
1893 establishments in British India
1893 in international relations
History of Pakistan
Modern history of Afghanistan
Eponymous border lines
Great Game
International borders
Pakistan
Afghanistan